Montblanquet is a locality located in the municipality of Vallbona de les Monges, in Province of Lleida province, Catalonia, Spain. As of 2020, it has a population of 9.

Geography 
Montblanquet is located 66km east-southeast of Lleida.

References

Populated places in the Province of Lleida